Developed and used by cultures living in forested areas, drums served as an early form of long-distance communication, and were used during ceremonial and religious functions.

Types

Talking Drum 
While this type of hourglass-shaped instrument can be modulated quite closely, its range is limited to a gathering or market-place, and it is primarily used in ceremonial settings. Ceremonial functions could include dance, rituals, story-telling and communication of points of order.

Some of the groups of variations of the talking drum among West African ethnic groups:

Tama (Wolof of Senegal)
Gan gan, Dun Dun (Yoruba of Nigeria and eastern Benin)
Dondo (Akan of central Ghana and Cote d'Ivoire)
Lunna (Dagomba of northern Ghana; Mossi of Burkina Faso)
Kalangu (Hausa of northern Nigeria, Niger, northern Ghana, Benin and Cameroon)
Doodo (Songhai and Zarma of Mali, Burkina Faso, and Niger)

In the 20th century the talking drums have become a part of popular music in West Africa, especially in the music genres of Jùjú (Nigeria) and Mbalax (Senegal).

Slit gongs 
Message drums, or more properly slit gongs, with hollow chambers and long, narrow openings that resonate when struck, are larger all-wood instruments hollowed out from a single log. Slit-log drums are common in the drum communication systems of Papua New Guinea, where they are known in Tok Pisin as garamut. Variations in the thickness of the walls would vary the tones when struck by heavy wooden drum sticks. While some were simple utilitarian pieces they could also be highly elaborate works of sculpture while still retaining their function. Often there are small stands under each end of the drum to keep it off of the ground and let it vibrate more freely.

These drums were made out of hollowed logs. The bigger the log, the louder sound would be made and thus the farther it could be heard. A long slit would be cut in one side of the tree trunk. Next, the log would be hollowed out through the slit, leaving lips (wooden ledges) on each side of the opening. A drum could be tuned to produce a lower note and a higher note. For that it would need to be hollowed out more under one lip than under the other. The drum's lips are hit with sticks, beating out rhythms of high and low notes.

"The talking drums" or "jungle drums" is also a euphemism for gossip – similar to "the grapevine".

Cambarysu 
The Catuquinaru tribe of Brazil reportedly used a drum called the cambarysu to send vibrations through the ground to other cambarysus up to 1.5 km away. Some scholars expressed skepticism that the device existed, and that it sent vibrations through the ground rather than the air.

Drum languages

In Africa, New Guinea and the tropical America, people have used drum telegraphy to communicate with each other from far away for centuries. When European expeditions came into the jungles to explore the local forest, they were surprised to find that the message of their coming and their intention was carried through the woods a step in advance of their arrival. African drummers can transmit a message at the speed of 100 miles per hour.

Among the famous communication drums are the drums of West Africa (see talking drum). From regions known today as Nigeria and Ghana they spread across West Africa and to America and the Caribbean during the slave trade. There they were banned because they were being used by the slaves to communicate over long distances in a code unknown to their enslavers.

Talking drums were also used in East Africa and are described by Andreus Bauer in the 'Street of Caravans' while acting as security guard in the Wissmann Truppe for the caravan of Charles Stokes.

The traditional drumming found in Africa is actually of three different types. Firstly, a rhythm can represent an idea (or signal); secondly it can repeat the accentual profile of a spoken utterance; or thirdly it can simply be subject to musical laws.

Drum communication methods are not languages in their own right; they are based on spoken languages. The sounds produced are conventionalized or idiomatic signals based on speech patterns. The messages are normally very stereotyped and context-dependent. They lack the ability to form new combinations and expressions.

In Central and East Africa, drum patterns represent the stresses, syllable lengths and tone of the particular African language. In tone languages, where syllables are associated with a certain tone, some words are distinguished only by their suprasegmental profile. Therefore, syllable drum languages can often transfer a message using the tonal phonemes alone.

In certain languages, the pitch of each syllable is uniquely determined in relation to each adjacent syllable. In these cases, messages can be transmitted as rapid beats at the same speed as speech as the rhythm and melody both match the equivalent spoken utterance.

Misinterpretations can occur due to the highly ambiguous nature of the communication. This is reduced by context effects and the use of stock phrases. For example, in Jabo, most stems are monosyllabic. By using a proverb or honorary title to create expanded versions of an animal, person's name or object, the corresponding single beat can be replaced with a rhythmic and melodic motif representing the subject. In practice not all listeners understand all of the stock phrases; the drum language is understood only to the level of their immediate concern.

See also 

 Communication
 Drum
 Gong
 Slit drum
 Talking drum
 Whistled language

References

 Schmidt-Jones, C. (2005, May 24). Message Drums. Connexions (licensed under CC-BY 1.0)

External links 
 Talking Drum from Instrument Encyclopedia, including a sound sample
 Drum Language in Ghanaian Schools

 

History of telecommunications
Drums

fr:Tambour (communication)
ja:トーキングドラム